Frederick Allan Moranis (born April 18, 1953) is a Canadian actor, comedian, musician, songwriter, writer and producer. He appeared in the sketch comedy series Second City Television (SCTV) in the 1980s and several Hollywood films, including Strange Brew (1983), Ghostbusters (1984) and Ghostbusters II (1989), Little Shop of Horrors (1986), Spaceballs (1987), Honey, I Shrunk the Kids (1989, and its 1992 and 1997 sequels), Parenthood (1989), My Blue Heaven (1990), and The Flintstones (1994).

In 1997, Moranis began a long break from acting to dedicate his time to his two children as a widower. He has not appeared in a live-action film for over 25 years, although he provided voice-over work for a few animated films, including Disney's Brother Bear (2003). He also released comedy albums and made appearances at fan conventions.

In 2020, after a hiatus of nearly 23 years from live-action films, Moranis signed to appear in a new sequel to Honey, I Shrunk the Kids, called Shrunk.

Early life
Moranis was born in Toronto, Ontario, to a Jewish family. He went to elementary school with Geddy Lee, frontman of the rock band Rush.

Career
His career as an entertainer began as a radio disc jockey in the mid-1970s, using the on-air name "Rick Allan" at three Toronto radio stations.

In the mid-1970s, Rick and comedy partner Rob Cowan, also a budding young radio announcer, performed on CBC-TV. Their spoof of Hockey Night in Canada was popular, and they periodically performed it on the road, including a charity sports dinner in Sarnia, Ontario.

In 1977, he teamed up with Winnipeg-born writer/director and performer Ken Finkleman on a series of live performances on CBC's 90 Minutes Live; comedy radio specials; and television comedy pilots, including one called Midweek and another called 1980 (produced at CBC Toronto in 1979). Both pilots starred Finkleman and Moranis in a series of irreverent sketches, including an early mockumentary sketch featuring Moranis as a Canadian movie producer, and another featuring the dubbed-in voiceovers of Nazi war criminals as they appear to be discussing their Hollywood agents and the money one can earn being interviewed on major documentary series like The World at War.

In 1980 Moranis was persuaded to join the third-season cast of Second City Television (SCTV) by friend and SCTV writer/performer Dave Thomas. At the time, Moranis was the only cast member not to have come from a Second City stage troupe. He is known for such impressions as Woody Allen, George Carlin, Merv Griffin, and David Brinkley.

With SCTV moving to CBC in 1980 (and syndicated to the United States), Moranis and Thomas were challenged to fill two additional minutes with "identifiable Canadian content," and created a sketch called The Great White North featuring the characters Bob and Doug McKenzie, a couple of Canadian buffoons. By the time NBC ordered 90-minute programs for the U.S. in 1981 (the fourth season of SCTV overall), there had been such favourable feedback from affiliates on the McKenzies that the network requested the duo have a sketch in every show.

Bob and Doug became a pop-culture phenomenon, which led to a top-selling and Grammy-nominated album, Great White North, and the 1983 movie Strange Brew, Moranis's first major film role.

Another notable Moranis character on SCTV was Gerry Todd, a disc jockey who presented music clips on television. The sketch aired before the debut of MTV in the United States, leading both Sound & Vision and Martin Short to dub Moranis as the creator of the video jockey. "There had been no such thing" up until that point, recalled Short, so "the joke was that there would be such a thing."

Feature films

After his SCTV work and the Strange Brew movie, Moranis had a busy career in feature films that lasted over a decade, most notably Ghostbusters; Spaceballs; Little Shop of Horrors; and Honey, I Shrunk the Kids and its sequels. He also did the voice-over for a short-lived cartoon series on NBC called Gravedale High (1990).

Moranis was also slated to appear (as the janitor) in the 1985 John Hughes film, The Breakfast Club. After a week or so of filming, Moranis was released by producer Ned Tanen because he felt Moranis' interpretation of the role as an over-the-top Russian caricature was not appropriate for the serious nature of the film. Moranis presented the departure as a mutual decision and hoped to work with Hughes in the future.

Moranis was originally cast as Phil Berquist in the 1991 film City Slickers, but later dropped out due to his wife's illness.

Moranis's last film roles were Barney Rubble in The Flintstones (1994) and the box-office flop Big Bully (1996). Other than the Honey, I Shrunk the Kids sequels, by the mid-1990s his only appearance in that genre was a 1993 music video, "Tomorrow's Girls" by Donald Fagen, in which he played a man married to an extraterrestrial woman. Disney's final film in the Honey, I Shrunk the Kids franchise is 1997's direct-to-video film Honey, We Shrunk Ourselves, in which Moranis is the final remaining original cast member. The series Honey, I Shrunk the Kids: The TV Show also launched in 1997 but without Moranis; it concluded in 2000. He worked for Disney twice more (with his fellow SCTV alumnus Dave Thomas), voicing Rutt the moose in the 2003 animated film Brother Bear and its direct-to-video sequel.

In a 2004 interview, Moranis talked about his favourite kinds of films:

Acting hiatus 
In 1997, Moranis took a hiatus from working in the film industry. He later explained, "I'm a single parent and I just found that it was too difficult to manage to raise my kids and to do the traveling involved in making movies. So I took a little bit of a break. And the little bit of a break turned into a longer break, and then I found that I really didn't miss it."

After having declined an invitation to make a cameo appearance in 2016's Ghostbusters, Moranis clarified in an interview with The Hollywood Reporter that despite his hiatus he had not, in fact, retired from acting in films, but instead had become selective about future roles.

Later work 
In 2001, Moranis received his first film credit since 1997 when he provided voice work in the animated film Rudolph the Red-Nosed Reindeer and the Island of Misfit Toys.

, Moranis was on the Advisory Committee for the comedy program at Humber College.

In 2005, Moranis released an album titled The Agoraphobic Cowboy, featuring country songs with lyrics that Moranis says follow in the comic tradition of songwriters/singers such as Roger Miller, Kinky Friedman, and Jim Stafford. The album was produced by Tony Scherr and is distributed through ArtistShare, as well as Moranis's official website. Commenting on the origins of the songs, he said that in 2003, "Out of the blue, I just wrote a bunch of songs. For lack of a better explanation, they're more country than anything. And I actually demoed four or five of them, and I'm not sure at this point what I'm going to do with them — whether I'm going to fold them into a full-length video or a movie. But, boy, I had a good time doing that."<ref name=sound>{{Cite web|title=An Hour with ''SCTVs Rick Moranis|archive-url=https://web.archive.org/web/20090714022536/http://www.soundandvisionmag.com/article.asp?article_id=650|archive-date=July 14, 2009|work=Sound & Vision|date=August 2004|url=http://www.soundandvisionmag.com/article.asp?article_id=650}}</ref>

On December 8, 2005, The Agoraphobic Cowboy was nominated for the 2006 Grammy for Best Comedy Album. On February 3, 2006, Moranis performed "Press Pound" on Late Night with Conan O'Brien and discussed the development of his music career.

In November 2007, Moranis reunited with Dave Thomas for a 24th anniversary special of Bob and Doug McKenzie, titled Bob and Doug McKenzie's 2–4 Anniversary. The duo shot new footage for this special. Thomas subsequently created a new animated Bob and Doug McKenzie series, Bob & Doug, for his company Animax Entertainment. Moranis declined to voice the role of Bob, which was taken over by Dave Coulier, but remained involved in the series as an executive producer.

On June 18, 2013, Moranis released the comedy album titled My Mother's Brisket & Other Love Songs, his first album in eight years. Moranis said of the release, "When I first began writing jokes and sketches with various Jewish partners one of us would inevitably stop at some point and announce, 'Too Jewish!' Too Jewish for the star, the show, the network, or the audience. The songs on this album are all in that category. I grew up hearing the Allan Sherman and the You Don't Have to Be Jewish albums in the '60s. Now I am in my 60s."

In a June 2013 interview, Moranis talked about reprising his role as Louis Tully in a third Ghostbusters film and his disappointment with the sequel. Moranis said, "I haven't talked to Dan Aykroyd about it. Somebody he's associated with called me and I said, 'I wouldn't not do it, but it's got to be good.' You know, I'm not interested in doing anything I've already done, and I thought the second one was a disappointment. But I guess I'm interested in where that guy is now. I sort of see him as being Bernie Madoff's cellmate in jail. Both of them being so orderly that they race to get up and make their beds." In 2015, regarding an offer for a brief appearance in the 2016 film, he concluded, "Ghostbusters didn't appeal to me. I wish them well, but it just makes no sense to me."

In July 2017, Moranis and Dave Thomas reprised their Bob and Doug characters at a benefit concert in Toronto. Proceeds from the benefit went toward caring for Jake Thomas, Dave's nephew, who suffered a spinal cord injury that has left him paralyzed from the waist down.

On May 9, 2018, Moranis returned as the character Dark Helmet from Spaceballs in an episode of The Goldbergs, albeit as a voice. He also appeared in an episode of Prop Culture discussing the film.

Moranis appears in the Martin Scorsese–directed Second City TV reunion documentary, titled An Afternoon with SCTV, set to premiere on Netflix in 2021.

In 2020, Moranis signed on to reprise his role as Wayne Szalinski in Shrunk, a new sequel in the Honey, I Shrunk the Kids series. When completed, it will mark a return to live-action films for Moranis after a hiatus of over two decades. Later the same year he appeared in a commercial for Mint Mobile alongside Ryan Reynolds.

Personal life
Moranis married costume designer Ann Belsky in 1986; together they had two children, a son and a daughter. Belsky died of cancer in February 1991.Survivor Net. "Actor Rick Moranis Took 23-Year On-Screen Hiatus After Wife Died of Breast Cancer, But He’s Back In Spotlight With Ryan Reynolds & Fans Are Thrilled" October 23, 2020. Moranis then slowly left public life to become a full-time single father.

On October 1, 2020, at approximately 7:30 am ET, Moranis was the victim of an assault in New York City, in the vicinity of West 70th St, Manhattan. He suffered minor injuries to his head, back, and hip. He reported the incident to the New York Police Department (NYPD) who posted security footage from the attack. The alleged perpetrator was arrested in New York City on November 14, 2020.

Filmography
Film

Television

Video games

Discography

Albums
1989: You, Me, the Music and Me 
2005: The Agoraphobic Cowboy 
2013: My Mother's Brisket & Other Love SongsBob and Doug McKenzie1981: The Great White North 
1983: Strange Brew soundtrackOther soundtrack appearances'''

Audio/video
1973: "Rock Radio Scrapbook" (as Rick Allan)

Awards and nominations

References

External links
 
 
 
 Article at thecanadianencyclopedia.ca

1953 births
Living people
Audiobook narrators
Canadian emigrants to the United States
Canadian male comedians
Canadian male film actors
Canadian male television actors
Canadian male voice actors
Canadian people of Hungarian-Jewish descent
Canadian radio personalities
Canadian sketch comedians
Canadian television personalities
Comedians from Toronto
Jewish Canadian comedians
Jewish Canadian male actors
Male actors from Toronto
Primetime Emmy Award winners
Warner Records artists
20th-century Canadian male actors
21st-century Canadian male actors
ArtistShare artists